Asagena italica is a species of cobweb spider in the family Theridiidae. It is found in France, Switzerland, Italy, and Algeria. They are typically found in olive groves and farmland.

References

Theridiidae
Spiders described in 1996
Spiders of Europe